Henri Prevost (6 March 1904 – 4 November 1969) was a French racing cyclist. He rode in the 1929 Tour de France.

References

1904 births
1969 deaths
French male cyclists
Place of birth missing